George S Paul, also known as G. S. Paul (born 25 January 1947) is an Indian writer, essayist and music journalist. He was born to Rev. K. C. Samuel and Thankamma Samuel in Thiruvalla, Pathanamthitta district of Kerala.

Early life and education
After graduating in physics, Paul took a postgraduate diploma in journalism. He was professor and head of the physics department at Christ College, Irinjalakuda.

Career
Paul was a member of the senate in the University of Calicut from 1994 till 1998. He has contributed to the Hindu, Economic Times and Indian Express as an art and culture critic. He has written on music and classical performing art forms like Kathakali, Koodiyattam and Mohiniyattam since the 1980s. He has also authored Swarangalude Sasthram, Vasundhara and Odyssey of a Dancer. He has been invited to present papers in various national seminars. He sat on the jury committee of Swathi puraskaram, Nrithya Natyapuraskaram, pallavur Appumarar puraskaram. He was an executive committee member of Kerala Sangeetha Nataka Akademi during the tenure of actor Murali as chairman. He was also an executive committee member of Kerala Kalamandalam.

References

External links
https://www.thehindu.com/features/friday-review/music/sweet-song-of-success/article3939351.ece
https://notionpress.com/author/george_s_paul
https://lasyafinearts.com/kalakshetra-faculty
https://www.thehindu.com/news/cities/Kochi/celebrating-a-graceful-dance-form/article2997856.ece
https://www.thehindu.com/news/cities/Kochi/shatkala-govinda-smriti-mahotsavam-from-oct-20/article19873052.ece
https://www.thehindu.com/features/friday-review/theatre/master-of-the-word/article5732177.ece
https://www.thehindu.com/entertainment/dance/mohiniyattam-moved-centre-stage-as-dancers-explored-the-form-and-dynamics-of-the-dance-at-a-mohiniyattam-workshop-in-thrissur/article25565108.ece
https://www.thehindu.com/features/friday-review/dance/taking-classical-dance-to-the-masses/article4977451.ece
http://archives.iffk.in/index.php?page=homage_09]
https://www.thehindu.com/entertainment/a-festival-of-performing-arts-in-thrissur-showcased-a-spectrum-of-expressions-mirroring-the-current-politico-cultural-state-of-affairs/article27065946.ece
https://www.thehindu.com/features/friday-review/theatre/tireless-crusader/article2777737.ece
https://www.thehindu.com/features/friday-review/theatre/theatre-veteran-c-l-jose-traces-his-journey/article8499188.ece
https://www.newindianexpress.com/states/kerala/2011/nov/12/shatkala-govinda-marar-music-fest-begins-309361.html
https://www.thehindu.com/features/friday-review/music/in-the-service-of-music/article3746659.ece
https://www.thehindu.com/features/friday-review/music/recording-a-trend/article5119623.ece
https://www.thehindu.com/entertainment/music/vishnu-dev-namboodiri-scored-with-his-choice-of-kritis-at-a-concert-in-thrissur/article26397425.ece
https://www.thehindu.com/features/friday-review/Eloquent-notes/article14397009.ece

Indian music critics
Dance critics
Indian music journalists
20th-century Indian journalists
1947 births
Indian editors
Journalists from Kerala
Living people